The 2015 Asian Shooting Championships was held in Kuwait between November 1 and November 12. This tournament was supposed to be an Asian qualifying tournament for the 2016 Summer Olympics in Rio. However, this qualification event lost its Rio Olymipics qualification status when the IOC suspended Kuwait NOC for government interference.

Yair Davidovitz an Israeli International Shooting Sport Federation (ISSF) technical delegate, was slated to supervise the event in Kuwait for the ISSF in 2015. Kuwait rejected the Israeli's visa for the 2015 Asian Shooting Championships which was originally the tournament that would offer Asian quotas for the 2016 Rio Olympics, and Davidovitz was backed by the International Olympic Committee and the ISSF, and the qualifiers were moved to New Delhi, India.  The IOC said: "The decision comes after the designated technical delegate from the ISSF, Yair Davidovich (Israel), who was due to supervise the event on behalf of the ISSF, was denied a visa by the Kuwaiti Immigration Department. The denial of a visa is against the non-discrimination principle of the Olympic Charter."

Medal summary

Men

Women

Medal table

References 

Results1
Results2

External links 
ISSF Results
Events

Asian Shooting Championships
Asian
Shooting
2015 in Kuwaiti sport
Shooting competitions in Kuwait